Riopa goaensis is a species of skink found in India.

References

 Sharma, R. C. 1976 Records of the reptiles of Goa. Records of the Zoological Survey of India, 71 (1975): 149–167.

Riopa
Reptiles described in 1976
Reptiles of India
Endemic fauna of India
Taxa named by Ramesh Chandra Sharma
Taxobox binomials not recognized by IUCN